Academia Cotopaxi (Academia Cotopaxi American International School) is an English-based, independent, non-profit, international school in Quito, Ecuador.

Alice Conger was the first director of the school. This school maintains a majority of international students, who are the children of the diplomatic missions to Ecuador and children of employees of major international corporations, as well as local students.

History 
Classes were first located in a building called the Ecuadorian-American Center, which no longer exists, located on Avenida 6 de Diciembre. Cotopaxi's educational experience was well underway: the first curriculum was derived from the Calvert Correspondence System combined with courses from the University of Nebraska.

Between the years of 1959 through 1960, the school established their first campus in a large house on the corner of Avenida de Los Estadios and República de El Salvador

Academia Cotopaxi became the first school to offer the IB diploma in Ecuador (1981), joined several organizations, gained accreditation from regional US agencies, adopted the IB Primary Years Program, and grew their education model to include the ONE Institute language center and the IMAGINE preschool programs

Notable alumni

References

External links
 Academia Cotopaxi Website

Private schools in Ecuador
American international schools in Ecuador
International schools in Quito
International Baccalaureate schools in Ecuador
Association of American Schools in South America